The Donizetti Museum (Museo Donizettiano) is a cultural site in Bergamo, in Lombardy, Italy. It is dedicated to the composer Gaetano Donizetti (1797–1848), who was born in the city.

History
The centenary in 1897 of the composer's birth was marked in Bergamo by an exhibition at the Palazzo delle Scuole in Contrada Tre Passi, and the unveiling of the Donizetti Monument in Piazza Cavour. From these events the idea of a permanent exhibition originated.

The Rota Basoni family had looked after the composer during the last months of his life.

They were donated on condition that the material should be preserved in a museum. The collection was the basis of the Donizetti Museum, which opened in September 1906. Further exhibits have been added over the following decades. Guido Zavadini (1868–1958) was the museum's director from 1909 to his death, and published a catalogue of the museum in 1936.

Description
An exhibition of portraits, memorabilia and documents shows the composer at different stages of his life: his studies in Bergamo and Bologna from 1806 to 1817, the developing composer to 1822, and the successful composer of operas between then and 1845. It also shows the personal life of Donizetti, and, through autograph scores, the composer at work.

See also
 Donizetti's birthplace
 List of music museums

References

Gaetano Donizetti
Biographical museums in Italy
Music museums in Italy
Museums in Bergamo